The Visakhapatnam Urban Development Authority or VUDA was the urban planning agency of Visakhapatnam, in the Indian state of Andhra Pradesh. It was formed in 1978, vide an act of the State Assembly of Andhra Pradesh. Its jurisdiction was expanded in 2018 by merging it with the surrounding mandals to form Visakhapatnam Metropolitan Region Development Authority.

Jurisdiction 
Under the jurisdiction of VUDA, the Visakhapatnam Metropolitan Region (VMR), comprises, Visakhapatnam and the districts of Srikakulam, Visakhapatnam ,  Anakapalli and Vizianagaram. Anakapalle and Bheemunipatnam were merged in Greater Visakhapatnam Municipal Corporation (GVMC).

Defunct
It was dissolved to form a new authority in the name of VMRDA

References

Organisations based in Visakhapatnam
Government of Visakhapatnam
State urban development authorities of India
Urban development authorities of Andhra Pradesh
Uttarandhra
1978 establishments in Andhra Pradesh
2018 disestablishments in India